Yohanna is both a given name and a surname. Notable people with the name include:

Yohanna Barnaba Abdallah (died 1924), Mozambican writer
Yohanna Dickson (1920–2015), Nigerian military official
Yohanna Idha (born 1978), Swedish actress
Yohanna Logan (born 1975), American fashion designer
Yohanna Madaki (1941–2006), Nigerian lawyer
Buba Yohanna (born 1982), Cameroonian footballer

See also
Jóhanna Guðrún Jónsdóttir (born 1990), Icelandic singer, known as Yohanna
Yohannan